The Orontes (from Ancient Greek) or Asi is a river with a length of  in Western Asia that begins in Lebanon, flowing northwards through Syria before entering the Mediterranean Sea near Samandağ in Turkey.

As the chief river of the northern Levant, the Orontes was the site of several major battles. Among the most important cities on the river are Homs, Hama, Jisr al-Shughur, and Antakya (the ancient Antioch, which was also known as "Antioch on the Orontes").

Names
In the 9th century BCE, the ancient Assyrians referred to the river as Arantu, and the nearby Egyptians called it Araunti. The etymology of the name is unknown, yet some sources indicate that it might be derived from Arnt which means "lioness" in Syriac languages; others called it Alimas, a "water goddess" in Aramaic. However, Arantu gradually became "Orontes" in Greek.

In the Greek epic poem Dionysiaca (circa 400 CE), the river is said to have been named after Orontes, an Indian military leader who killed himself and fell into the river after losing to Dionysus in single combat. According to the Greek geographer Strabo (in Geographica, circa 20 CE), the river was originally named Typhon, because it was said that Zeus had struck the dragon Typhon down from the sky with thunder, and the river had formed where Typhon's body had fallen; however, the river was later renamed Orontes when a man named Orontes built a bridge on it.

In contrast, Macedonian settlers in Apamea named it the Axius, after a Macedonian river god. The Arabic name  is derived from the ancient Axius. The word coincidentally means "insubordinate" in Arabic, which folk etymology ascribes to the fact that the river flows from the south to the north unlike the rest of the rivers in the region.

The part of the river flowing from Lake Homs to Homs is known as al-Mimas, after the sanctuary of Deir Mimas situated there in honor of Saint Mamas.

Course
The Orontes rises in the springs near Labweh in Lebanon on the east side of the Beqaa Valley (in the Beqaa Governorate) between Mount Lebanon on the west and the Anti-Lebanon Mountains on the east, very near the source of the southward-flowing Litani, and runs north, falling  through a gorge to leave the valley. The Ain ez Zarqa is one such major spring. Other major springs are Al Ghab, Al Rouj, and Al-Azraq.

Leaving this gorge, it expands into the Lake of Homs  (an artificial lake created by a Roman-era dam, also known as Qattinah lake) in the  Homs Governorate of Syria and through the city of Homs (or Ḥimṣ). Next it flows through the Hama Governorate and its capital of Hamah (Hamaih-Epiphaneia), and the ancient site of Larissa (Shaizar). This is where the river enters the Ghab plain.
Further downstream, on the eastern edge of the Ghab, is located the ancient city of Apamea. To the west is the Coastal Mountain Range. The last Syrian governorate it goes through is Idlib and the city of Jisr al-Shughur. This section ends at the rocky barrier of Jisr al-Hadid, where the river turns west into the plain of Antioch (Amik Valley) in the Hatay Province of Turkey.

Two major tributaries, the southward-flowing Afrin River on the west and the Karasu on the east, join the Orontes through the former Lake Amik via an artificial channel (Nahr al-Kowsit).

History
The Orontes is not easily navigable and the valley derives its historical importance as a road for north–south traffic; from Antioch south to Homs and thence to Damascus via al-Nabek. The Orontes has long been a boundary marker. For the Ancient Egyptians it marked the northern extremity of Amurru, east of Phoenicia. On the Orontes was fought the major Battle of Kadesh (circa 1274 BCE) between the Egyptian army of Ramesses II from the south and the Hittite army of Muwatalli II from the north. The river was also the site of the Battle of Qarqar fought in 853 BCE, when the army of Assyria, led by king Shalmaneser III, encountered an allied army of 12 kings led by Hadadezer of Damascus.

  Alexander the Great acquired the river valley after the defeat of the Persians in 333 BCE at the Battle of Issus.  After his death in 323 BCE, it became part of the Seleucid Empire.
Seleucid cities founded on the Orontes included Seleucia ad Belum, Antigonia, and Antioch. Several Hellenistic artefacts feature the Tyche of Antioch with a male swimmer personifying the Orontes at her feet. 

In 64 BCE Pompey took the Orontes river valley and made it part of the new Roman province of Syria with Antioch as its capital. Lake Homs Dam was built by the Roman emperor Diocletian in 290 CE.  In 198 CE the province was split with the lower Orontes in the new province of Coele Syria and the upper Orontes from Emesa (modern day Homs) south in Syria Phoenice.   Emesa was later raised to co-capital of the latter.  

In 637 CE the Battle of the Iron Bridge near Antioch was fought between the forces of the  Rashidun Caliphate and the  Byzantine Empire near the Iron bridge and won by the former which shortly took control of the whole of the river valley.  

For the Crusaders in the 12th century, the Orontes River became the permanent boundary between the Principality of Antioch and that of Aleppo.  

The construction of a Syria–Turkey Friendship Dam was started in 2011 but postponed because of the Syrian Civil War.

In art
The French writer Maurice Barrès purportedly transcribed in Un jardin sur l'Oronte (1922) a story that an Irish archaeologist had translated for him from a manuscript one evening in June 1914 at a café in Hama by the Orontes.

See also
Al-Mina – archaeological site at the mouth of the Orontes
Baalbek – a town and archaeological site just to the south of the source of the Orontes
Tell Tayinat and Tell Atchana – archaeological sites near each other in Hatay
Water resources management in Syria

Notes

References

External links

 Pop-up map of the Orontes River available at: 
 Map of the Orontes River Basin: 

International rivers of Asia
Landforms of Hatay Province
Rivers of Lebanon
Rivers of Syria
Rivers of Turkey
Orontes basin